The Santa Cruz River of New Mexico is a tributary of the Rio Grande at Española, New Mexico.  The Santa Cruz River valley is the site of El Santuario de Chimayo, a mission chapel built by early Spanish colonists of the Santa Fe area.

References

Rivers of New Mexico
Tributaries of the Rio Grande
Española, New Mexico